The Kaman HH-43 Huskie is a helicopter with intermeshing rotors used by the United States Air Force, the United States Navy and the United States Marine Corps from the 1950s until the 1970s. It was primarily used for aircraft firefighting and rescue in the close vicinity of air bases, but was later used as a short-range overland search and rescue aircraft during the Vietnam War.

Under the aircraft designation system used by the U.S. Navy pre-1962, Navy and U.S. Marine Corps versions were originally designated as the HTK, HOK or HUK, for their use as training, observation or utility aircraft, respectively.

Design and development
In 1947 Anton Flettner, a German aviation engineer, was brought to New York in the United States as part of Operation Paperclip. He was the developer of Germany's Flettner Fl 282 "Kolibri" (Hummingbird), a helicopter employing the "synchropter" principle of intermeshing rotors, a unique design principle that dispenses with the need for a tail rotor.  Flettner settled in the US and became the chief designer of the Kaman company, where he designed new helicopters using the synchropter principle.

The Huskie had an unusual intermeshing contra-rotating twin-rotor arrangement with control effected by servo-flaps. The first prototype flew in 1947 and was adopted by the US Navy as the HTK-1 with a  Lycoming O-435-4 flat-six piston engine. In 1954, in an experiment by Kaman and the US Navy, one HTK-1 was modified and flew with its piston engine replaced by two turbine engines, becoming the world's first twin-turbine helicopter. A much more powerful  Pratt & Whitney R-1340 Wasp radial piston engine was used for the far heavier HOK-1, HUK-1, and H-43A versions for the Marines, Navy, and Air Force, respectively. The Air Force later adopted versions with a single turboshaft engine: the HH-43B and HH-43F.

Operational history
This aircraft saw use in the Vietnam War with several detachments of the Pacific Air Rescue Center, the 33d, 36th, 37th, and 38th Air Rescue Squadrons, and the 40th Aerospace Rescue and Recovery Squadron, where the aircraft was known by its call sign "Pedro". During the war, the two-pilot HH-43 Huskie flew more rescue missions than all other aircraft combined, because of its unique hovering capability.  The HH-43 was eventually replaced by newer aircraft in the early 1970s.

Variants

K-240 company designation from HTK-1/TH-43E
K-600 proposed civilian counterpart of HOK-1
K-600-3 civilian counterpart of H-43B
K-600-4 company designation of HOK-3 development
K-600-5 HH-43F
XHTK-1 two two-seat aircraft for evaluation
HTK-1 three-seat production version powered by a  Lycoming O-435-4 flat-six piston engine for the United States Navy, later became TH-43E, 29 built
XHTK-1G one example for evaluation by the United States Coast Guard
HTK-1K one example for static tests as a drone
XHOK-1 prototype of United States Marine Corps version, two built
HOK-1 United States Marine Corps version powered by a  R-1340-48 Wasp radial piston engine; later became OH-43D, 81 built
HOK-3 proposed development powered by a Blackburn-Turbomeca Twin Turmo 600 turboshaft engine.
HUK-1 United States Navy version of the HOK-1 with R-1340-52 radial piston engine; later became UH-43C, 24 built
H-43A USAF version of the HOK-1; later became the HH-43A, 18 built
HH-43A post-1962 designation of the H-43A
H-43B H-43A powered by an  Lycoming T-53-L-1B turboshaft engine, three-seats and full rescue equipment; later became HH-43B, 200-built
HH-43B post-1962 designation of the H-43B
UH-43C post-1962 designation of the HUK-1
OH-43D post-1962 designation of the HOK-1
TH-43E post-1962 designation of the HTK-1
HH-43F HH-43B powered by an  T-53-L-11A turboshaft engine with reduced diameter rotors, 42 built and conversions from HH-43B
QH-43G One OH-43D converted to drone configuration

Operators

 
Burmese Air Force

Colombian Air Force
 Iran
Imperial Iranian Air Force

Royal Moroccan Air Force

Pakistan Air Force
Pakistan Navy

Royal Thai Air Force

 United States Air Force
 United States Marine Corps
 United States Navy

Surviving aircraft
In addition to those on static display and the airworthy example at the Olympic Flight Museum, many H-43s are still in use with private owners.

Burma
 UB6166 – HH-43B is on display at the Defence Services Museum in Naypyidaw, Mandalay.

Germany
 62-4547 – HH-43F on static display at the Hubschraubermuseum Bückeburg in Bückeburg, Lower Saxony.

Pakistan
 62-4556 – HH-43P on static display at the Pakistan Air Force Museum in Karachi, Sindh.

Thailand
 H5-2/05 – Type 5 on static display at the Royal Thai Air Force Museum in Bangkok, Bangkok.

United Kingdom
 62-4535 – HH-43B under restoration at the Midland Air Museum in Baginton, Warwickshire. This airframe is one of only two examples on display in the United Kingdom.

United States
 Composite – HH-43F on static display at the New England Air Museum in Windsor Locks, Connecticut. This airframe is painted as 60-0289, but was built up from parts of various HH-43s.
 129313 – HTK-1/TH-43E on static display at the Tillamook Air Museum in Tillamook, Oregon. This airframe is painted in Navy markings.

 129801 – HOK-1/OH-43S in storage at the New England Air Museum in Windsor Locks, Connecticut.
 138101 – HOK-1/OH-43D in storage at the United States Army Aviation Museum at Fort Rucker near Daleville, Alabama. BuNo 138101 was formerly displayed indoors at the National Naval Aviation Museum at NAS Pensacola, Florida (circa 1986-2001) in a dark blue finish with USMC markings. It was repainted from its original USMC markings to pre-Vietnam U.S. Army colors when it was loaned to the Army by the National Naval Aviation Museum.
 139974 – OH-43D on static display at the Pima Air & Space Museum, adjacent to Davis-Monthan AFB in Tucson, Arizona. This airframe is painted in USMC markings.
 139982 – HOK-1/OH-43D in storage at the Carolinas Aviation Museum in Charlotte, North Carolina. This airframe is painted in Marine Corps markings.
 139990 – HOK-1/OH-43D in storage at the Flying Leatherneck Aviation Museum at MCAS Miramar in San Diego, California. This airframe is painted in USMC markings. It was previously on display at MCAS Tustin in Tustin, California; but was moved to MCAS Miramar after MCAS Tustin was closed and NAS Miramar was transferred from control of the Navy to the Marine Corps.
 58-1837 – HH-43A in storage at the New England Air Museum in Windsor Locks, Connecticut.
 58-1841 – HH-43F on static display at the Military Firefighter Heritage Display at Goodfellow Air Force Base in San Angelo, Texas. It is incorrectly painted with Air Force Serial Number 58-1481. This Huskie was a ground trainer (circa 1962–1976) at Sheppard Air Force Base, so it retained the square-tail empennage that was removed from almost all other Huskies after repeated rotor strikes in heavy winds. After being sold by the military, but before arriving at its current location, it was on display at the Pate Museum of Transportation in Cresson, Texas.
 58-1853 – HH-43F on static display at the Museum of Aviation at Robins Air Force Base in Warner Robins, Georgia.
 59-1578 – HH-43F on static display at Kirtland Air Force Base in Albuquerque, New Mexico. This may be the same airframe listed on other sites as being located at the National Museum of Nuclear Science & History, which has since moved off-base, but adjacent to, Kirtland Air Force Base.
 60-0263 – HH-43B on static display at the National Museum of the United States Air Force at Wright-Patterson AFB in Dayton, Ohio.
 62-4513 – HH-43F on static display at the Castle Air Museum at the former Castle AFB in Atwater, California.
 62-4531 – HH-43F on static display at the Pima Air & Space Museum adjacent to Davis-Monthan AFB in Tucson, Arizona.
 62-4532 – HH-43B on static display at the Air Mobility Command Museum at Dover AFB in Dover, Delaware.
 62-4561 – HH-43B on static display at the Hill Aerospace Museum at Hill AFB in Roy, Utah.
 64-17558 – HH-43F airworthy at the Olympic Flight Museum in Olympia, Washington. This airframe is painted in USAF markings.

Specifications (HH-43F / K-600-5)

See also

References
Notes

Bibliography

 Chiles, James R. The God Machine: From Boomerangs to Black Hawks: The Story of the Helicopter. New York: Bantam Books, 2007. .
 Francillon, René J. McDonnell Douglas Aircraft since 1920: Volume II. London: Putnam, 1997. .
 Frawley, Gerard. The International Directory of Civil Aircraft, 2003-2004. Fyshwick, Canberra, Act, Australia: Aerospace Publications Pty Ltd., 2003, p. 155. .
 Munson, Kenneth. Helicopters and other Rotorcraft since 1907. London: Blandford Publishing, 1968. .
 Thicknesse, P. Military Rotorcraft (Brassey's World Military Technology series). London: Brassey's, 2000. .
 Wragg, David W. Helicopters at War: A Pictorial History. London: R. Hale, 1983. .

External links

 HH-43 page at the National Museum of the United States Air Force
 HH-43 Huskie Reference at Cybermodeler.com
 HH-43 Page at GlobalSecurity.org

Kaman aircraft
Firefighting equipment
Kaman HH-43 Huskie
H-43 Huskie
1950s United States helicopters
Search and rescue helicopters
Synchropters
Kaman HH-43 Huskie
Single-turbine helicopters
Aircraft first flown in 1953